Raymundo Fermín (born 15 March 1961) is a Dominican Republic table tennis player. He competed in the men's singles and the men's doubles events at the 1988 Summer Olympics.

References

1961 births
Living people
Dominican Republic male table tennis players
Olympic table tennis players of the Dominican Republic
Table tennis players at the 1988 Summer Olympics
Place of birth missing (living people)
Pan American Games medalists in table tennis
Pan American Games gold medalists for the Dominican Republic
Pan American Games silver medalists for the Dominican Republic
Pan American Games bronze medalists for the Dominican Republic
Table tennis players at the 1979 Pan American Games
Table tennis players at the 1983 Pan American Games
Medalists at the 1979 Pan American Games
Medalists at the 1983 Pan American Games